Arsham Parsi is an Iranian LGBT human rights activist living in exile in Canada. He is the founder and head of the International Railroad for Queer Refugees.

Personal life 
Parsi was born in Shiraz, Iran. As a gay Iranian, he felt alone until at age 15 he discovered solace in the Internet. Parsi began volunteering for underground gay organizations. At age 19, he began working for PGLO and networked with doctors to provide HIV testing. He responded to emails from suicidal gay teenagers. The strict laws against homosexuality forced Parsi to keep his work secret from friends and family. But in March 2005, Parsi realized the police were looking for him and fled from Iran to Turkey, where he spent 13 months. Unable to return to Iran, Parsi lives in Toronto, Ontario, Canada.

Activism
In 2001, Parsi had formed a small LGBT group online called Rangin Kaman (Rainbow Group), which was renamed as Persian Gay and Lesbian Organization in 2004. As the PGLO would not be recognized in Iran, a friend of Parsi's officially registered PGLO in Norway. The PGLO later became the foundation for Parsi's Toronto-based Iranian Queer Organization (IRQO) in 2006. Parsi later left IRQO and founded the International Railroad for Queer Refugees in 2008.
The organization's headquarters are in Toronto, Ontario, Canada and they provide services to all self-identified Iranian LGBTs worldwide.

He began secretly working for the advancement of civil rights for lesbians and gays in Iran. In 2003, he helped organize a clandestine Yahoo chat group for gay Iranians, called Voice Celebration. The group had 50 participants, who exchanged views on how best to achieve civil rights. Less than three years later, he was asked to speak publicly in Geneva, Switzerland, at the second session of United Nations Human Rights Council and on the fourth anniversary all international media published some articles about Iranian gays and lesbians.

Parsi was the executive director of the Iranian Queer Organization and director of the organization's online magazine, Cheraq for several years. In October 2008 he launched International Railroad for Queer Refugees. Parsi has been working on Iranian queer asylum cases.

He is an Iranian member of the International Lesbian and Gay Association (ILGA), based in Brussels, Belgium, and ambassador of Iran in the International Lesbian and Gay Cultural Network (ILGCN), based in Stockholm, Sweden. Director of the cultural committee at the Iranian Association of University of Toronto (IAUT) in 2007, Parsi is also a founding member of the Rainbow Railroad group based in Toronto, Ontario, Canada, and the Advisory Committee of the Hirschfeld Eddy Foundation.

Parsi's autobiography, Exiled for Love, was written with Marc Colbourne and published by Fernwood Publishing in 2015.

International recognition 
In April 2008, Iranian Queer Organization (IRQO) which was his former organization name awarded Felipa de Souza Award in 2008 by the New York-based International Gay and Lesbian Human Rights Commission (IGLHRC). Two months later, Parsi's work was recognized with the Pride Toronto Award for Excellence in Human Rights. In June 2015, Parsi was awarded by Logo TV for the International Trailblazer. Parsi is being featured in two galleries of Canadian Museum for Human Rights that is based in Winnipeg, Manitoba. Parsi and Marina Nemat are the only two Iranians that were selected for the museum.

Documentaries 
Parsi was interviewed by many major international media about the rights of LGBT people in Iran and Middle East and also featured in several documentaries including CBC Gay in Iran in 2007, A Jihad for Love by Parvez Sharma, and BBC's Iran Sex Change Solution by Ali Hamedani and many more.

See also
 International Railroad for Queer Refugees
 LGBT rights in Iran

References

External links
Arsham Parsi's official website
IRQR's official website

1981 births
Canadian memoirists
Canadian Muslims
Canadian gay writers
Iranian dissidents
Iranian emigrants to Canada
Iranian exiles
Iranian memoirists
Gay memoirists
Gay Muslims
Iranian LGBT writers
Canadian LGBT rights activists
Iranian LGBT rights activists
Living people
Muslim reformers
21st-century Canadian LGBT people
Activists from Toronto